Sodium/potassium-transporting ATPase gamma chain is a protein that in humans is encoded by the FXYD2 gene.

This gene encodes a member of a family of small membrane proteins that share a 35-amino acid signature sequence domain, beginning with the sequence PFXYD and containing 7 invariant and 6 highly conserved amino acids. The approved human gene nomenclature for the family is FXYD-domain containing ion transport regulator. Mouse FXYD5 has been termed RIC (Related to Ion Channel). FXYD2, also known as the gamma subunit of the Na,K-ATPase, regulates the properties of that enzyme. FXYD1 (phospholemman), FXYD2 (gamma), FXYD3 (MAT-8), FXYD4 (CHIF), and FXYD5 (RIC) have been shown to induce channel activity in experimental expression systems. Transmembrane topology has been established for two family members (FXYD1 and FXYD2), with the N-terminus extracellular and the C-terminus on the cytoplasmic side of the membrane. The Type III integral membrane protein encoded by this gene is the gamma subunit of the Na,K-ATPase present on the plasma membrane. Although the Na,K-ATPase does not depend on the gamma subunit to be functional, it is thought that the gamma subunit modulates the enzyme's activity by inducing ion channel activity. Mutations in this gene have been associated with renal hypomagnesaemia.

References

Further reading